Bob Ware (born 23 August 1941) is a former Australian rules footballer who played for Footscray in the Victorian Football League (VFL).

Ware, the nephew of club great Norman, started his VFL career as a half forward and kicked 19 goals in his debut season. He then developed into Footscray's back up ruckman and played in the 1961 VFL Grand Final loss to Hawthorn. Ware was still occasionally pushed forward and kicked a bag of five goals against Geelong in 1963.

A VFA representative at the 1966 Hobart Carnival, Ware played a Williamstown once he left Footscray.

References

Holmesby, Russell and Main, Jim (2007). The Encyclopedia of AFL Footballers. 7th ed. Melbourne: Bas Publishing.

1941 births
Australian rules footballers from Victoria (Australia)
Western Bulldogs players
Williamstown Football Club players
Living people